Utsavam is a 1975 Indian Malayalam-language film, directed by I. V. Sasi and written by Sherif. It is the directorial debut of Sasi. The film stars K. P. Ummer, Vincent, Srividya, Sankaradi, Raghavan, M. G. Soman and Sukumaran. It was released on 21 November 1975.

Plot

Cast 

K. P. Ummer
Vincent
Raghavan
Sukumaran
M G Soman
Janardhanan
Sankaradi
Bahadoor
Kuthiravattam Pappu
Srividya
Rani Chandra

Soundtrack 
The music was composed by A. T. Ummer and the lyrics were written by Poovachal Khader.

Box office 
The film was both a critical and commercial success.

References

External links 
 

1970s Malayalam-language films
1975 directorial debut films
1975 films
Films directed by I. V. Sasi